The West Chester Golden Rams represent West Chester University of Pennsylvania, which is located in West Chester, Pennsylvania, in intercollegiate sports. They compete in the Pennsylvania State Athletic Conference (PSAC) in NCAA Division II.

The university currently fields 23 varsity Division II men's and women's teams.

The men's basketball team is coached by Damien Blair and won its first NCAA Division II Tournament game in 2018. In 2019–20, the team was ranked eighth and began the season on a 13-game win streak.

The Men's soccer team is coached by Michael Benn, who has been with the Golden Rams for 10 years. He has led them to the NCAA Division II Tournament 4 times, one trip seeing them go to the National final and the PSAC conference tournament 7 times as of 2021.

Facilities
John A. Farrell Stadium (Football/Outdoor Track & Field)
Hollinger Field House (Men's & Women's Basketball/Volleyball/Men's & Women's Indoor Track & Field/Men's & Women's Diving)
Serpico Stadium (Baseball)
Rockwell Field (Men's & Women's Soccer)

Varsity athletic teams 

Men's
 Baseball
 Basketball
 Cross-Country
 Football
 Golf
 Soccer
 Swimming & Diving
 Tennis
 Track & Field

Women's
 Basketball
 Cheerleading
 Cross-Country
 Field Hockey
 Golf
 Gymnastics
 Lacrosse
 Rugby
 Soccer
 Softball
 Swimming & Diving
 Tennis
 Track & Field
 Volleyball

National championships
The West Chester University Golden Rams have won a total of eleven team national championships.

NCAA national team championships

AIAW/DGWS national team championships

Prior to the NCAA sanctioned women's sports, West Chester University's women's teams competed for national championships under the Association for Intercollegiate Athletics for Women (AIAW) and its predecessors, the Division for Girls' and Women's Sports (DGWS) and the Commission on Intercollegiate Athletics for Women (CIAW).

Notable athletes
Geno Auriemma (B.A. 1981) – University of Connecticut women's basketball head coach[9] 
Timothy Ferkler (B.A. 1986) – Quarterback of 1984 National Championship team
John Edelman – Former MLB pitcher
Pat Kelly – Major League Baseball Player - Second Baseman for the New York Yankees
John Mabry – 14-year MLB career 
Cathy Rush (B.S. 1968, M.Ed. 1972) – Former Immaculata University women's basketball head coach 
Joe Senser (1979) – Former NFL tight end, Minnesota Vikings 
Ralph Tamm (B.S. 1988) – Former NFL offensive guard 
Marian Washington (1970) – Former University of Kansas women's basketball head coach
Mike Washington – 2008 Philadelphia Sports Writers Association "Outstanding Amateur Athlete"
Joey Wendle – Major League Baseball All-Star for the Tampa Bay Rays
Don Williams (1963) – Center forward on the 1961 National Championship soccer team, three-time All-American
Lee Woodall (1993) – Former NFL linebacker, San Francisco 49ers 
Jerry Yeagley (1961) – Coached Indiana University to five NCAA Soccer Championships

See also
 Lacrosse in Pennsylvania

References

External links